Shri Subodh Kant Sahay (born 11 June 1951) is an Indian  politician. He served as three term MP (Lok sabha) of India. He represented the Ranchi constituency of Jharkhand and is a member of the Indian National Congress (INC)  political party. He had been holding important portfolios. He was the Cabinet Minister for Tourism until 28 OCT 2012. He is referred as one of the closest to former Prime Minister Dr. Manmohan Singh and former UPA Chairperson Smt. Sonia Gandhi. According to sources, Sonia Gandhi knew him for his truth and hard work. He was the Minister for Home in V.P. Singh government.
Sahay was asked to resign in 2012 from his ministerial post by Manmohan Singh in light of favouring his brother in allocation of coal mine blocks in the infamous Coal Scam.

Early life
Shri Subodh Kant Sahay was born in a religious Chitraguptvanshi Kayastha family in Latehar,(Jharkhand) to Shri. Brijdeo Sahay and Smt. Indrani Devi. He did his B.Sc., LL.B. from A N College, Patna and Ranchi University.He involved in social and welfare activities since student days and organised several National and State Level programmes for mobilisation of youth, working for the upliftment of the downtrodden, deprived and minority communities.

Political career
Subodh Kant Sahay was actively involved in the Non-Aligned Student and Youth Organisation (NASYO). He participated in Jai Prakash Movement of 70s and was groomed under the tutelage of Janta party stalwarts  like Chandrashekhar Singh, Satyendra Narain Sinha & Thakur Prasad. Upon behest of Bihar Janta party President Sinha he was placed as a candidate from Hatia, a seat he won and made his electoral debut in assembly. He was Member of Preparatory Committee, World Youth Festival; General Secretary, (i) Yuva Janata for three years; (ii) Janata Party for two years; (iii) Janata Dal for 6 months; Working President Yuva Janta for two years; President Yuva Janata for three years. He start his political career from Hatia, Ranchi.

He had been re-elected as the MP from Ranchi again in the elections in May 2009. Congress had managed to win only one seat from Ranchi out of 14 seats and only 3 seats from Bihar out of 40 seats. Sahay served as Minister Of State (Independent Charge) for Food Processing Industries in the First Manmohan Singh Cabinet from 2004 to 2009. On the second Congress victory in the 2009 elections which saw Manmohan Singh continue as Prime Minister, Sahay was elevated to Cabinet rank holding the same Food Processing Industries portfolio.

During the ministry shuffle in January 2011 he was given Cabinet Minister for Ministry of Tourism (India).

Personal life
Subodh Kant Sahay is married to Rekha Sahay, who is a famous theatre personality. They have a daughter named Yashaswini Sahay.

Position held
 1978-1989 Speaker, Bihar Legislative Assembly (three terms)
 President, Public Accounts Committee, Bihar Legislative Assembly (four years)
 President, Committee of Privileges, Bihar Legislative Assembly (two years)
 Vice President, Library Committee, Bihar Legislative Assembly (four years)
 1989 Elected to 9th Lok Sabha
 President, Committee on Petitions, Bihar Legislative Assembly (three years)
 April 1990 - November 1990 Union Minister, Home Affairs, Govt. of India
 November 1990 - June 1991 Union Minister of State (Independent Charge), Information & Broadcasting & Home Affairs, Govt. of India
 2004 Re-elected to 14th Lok Sabha (2nd term)
 2004 Union Minister of State (Independent Charge), Food & Food Processing Industries
 2006 Cabinet Minister, Food Processing
 2011 Cabinet Minister, Ministry of Tourism (India)
 2011 to 28 Oct 2012: Union Minister for Tourism.

References

1951 births
Indian National Congress politicians
Janata Dal politicians
Living people
People from Latehar district
India MPs 2004–2009
Union ministers of state of India with independent charge
V. P. Singh administration
India MPs 1989–1991
India MPs 2009–2014
Lok Sabha members from Jharkhand
Tourism ministers of India
Coal block allocation scam
Politicians from Ranchi